Ana Konjuh was the defending champion, but withdrew before the tournament began.

Karolína Plíšková won the title, defeating Alison Riske in the final, 7–6(10–8), 7–5.

Seeds

Draw

Finals

Top half

Bottom half

Qualifying

Seeds
The top two seeds receive a bye into the second round.

Qualifiers

Lucky losers

Qualifying draw

First qualifier

Second qualifier

Third qualifier

Fourth qualifier

References
 Main Draw
 Qualifying Draw

Nottingham Open - Singles
2016 Women's Singles